Syngenes is a genus of antlions belonging to the family Myrmeleontidae.

The species of this genus are found in Southern Africa.

Species:

Syngenes alluaudi 
Syngenes arabicus 
Syngenes carfii 
Syngenes debilis 
Syngenes dolichocercus 
Syngenes horridus 
Syngenes inquinatus 
Syngenes longicornis 
Syngenes maritimus 
Syngenes medialis 
Syngenes palpalis 
Syngenes scholtzi

References

Acanthaclisini
Myrmeleontidae genera